Gavin Catanach is an Australian former professional rugby league footballer who played in the 1980s and 1990s. He played for Balmain and Parramatta in the NSWRL competition.

Playing career
Catanach made his first-grade debut for Parramatta in round 5 of the 1989 NSWRL season against North Sydney at North Sydney Oval. Catanach played eight matches for Parramatta over four years at the club. In 1993, Catanach joined Balmain playing 12 games. Catanach's final match in the top grade was in round 22 of the 1993 NSWRL season against his former side Parramatta at Parramatta Stadium.

References

Balmain Tigers players
Parramatta Eels players
Australian rugby league players
Rugby league props
1970 births
Living people